The 2021–22 Hong Kong Third Division League was the 8th season of Hong Kong Third Division since it became the fourth-tier football league in Hong Kong in 2014–15.  The season began on 29 September 2021.

Format
Promotion and relegation was suspended during the 2020–21 season and the season was shortened to a single round-robin due to the COVID-19 pandemic in Hong Kong. As a result, all 16 teams from the previous season were permitted to remain during the 2021–22 season and four additional teams were approved for play. 

Beginning with the 2021–22 season, the Third Division will be played as a single round-robin.

League table

References

Hong Kong Third Division League seasons
2021–22 in Hong Kong football
Association football events curtailed and voided due to the COVID-19 pandemic